Andrei Gavrilov (born November 8, 1987) is a Russian professional ice hockey goaltender who currently plays for Everest Kohtla-Järve of the Estonian Hockey League (EHL). He has previously played with HC Vityaz Podolsk, Atlant Moscow Oblast, HC Sochi and Salavat Yulaev Ufa in the Kontinental Hockey League (KHL). He joined Salavat Yulaev on a one-year contract as a free agent on July 29, 2016.

References

External links

1987 births
Living people
Atlant Moscow Oblast players
Podhale Nowy Targ players
Salavat Yulaev Ufa players
HC Sochi players
HC Vityaz players
Russian ice hockey goaltenders